Mohammed Amir Hossain is a Bangladesh Awami League politician and the incumbent Member of Parliament from Comilla-2.

Career
Hossain was elected as a member of parliament in 2014 from Comilla-2 as a candidate of Jatiya Party (Ershad).

References

Jatiya Party politicians
Living people
10th Jatiya Sangsad members
People from Comilla District
Year of birth missing (living people)